Koghes (formerly Karmir Aghek) is a village in the Lori Province of Armenia. Populated by Pontic Greeks.

References 

Populated places in Lori Province